Visa Plus is a worldwide interbank network that provides cash to Visa cardholders. As a subsidiary of Visa Inc., it connects all Visa credit, debit and prepaid cards, as well as ATM cards issued by various banks worldwide bearing the Visa / Electron logo.

Plus System, Inc. started out as a consortium formed by 34 major U.S. banks to build a national network of automated teller machines (ATM). It initially was composed of 2,000 ATMs linking 1,000 banks and their customers in 47 states.
As the booming ATM industry outgrew regional networks and began to go nationwide in the mid-1980s, credit-card giant Visa sought entry in the lucrative ATM network business and acquired a third of Plus System in 1987. Currently, there are over one million Plus-linked ATMs in 170 countries worldwide.

By default, Visa / Electron cards are linked to the Plus network, but very often all three logotypes will be shown.

Plus is widely used as a local interbank network most common in the United States where networks such as STAR, NYCE and Pulse also compete. It is also used in Canada, though it is significantly smaller than Interac there, and in places such as India and Indonesia where there are many interbank networks. The main competitor of Plus System is the Cirrus network, which is owned by Mastercard, Visa's longtime rival.

References

External links 
 Visa ATM locator
 The Premier ATM Network: 1982-1992

Financial services companies established in 1982
Interbank networks
Visa Inc.